A Complete Demonstration is a compilation of early demo tracks by the band VAST. It was made available online in 2005 as a limited edition piece, with the first five hundred copies being signed by Jon Crosby, as well as being numbered.

Track listing

VAST albums
2005 albums